Romeo Romei  was the name of at least two ships of the Italian Navy named in honour of Romeo Romei, a World War II submarine commander, and may refer to:

 , a  launched in 1951 as USS Harder. In 1974 she was sold to Italy and renamed, she was decommissioned in 1988.
 , a  launched in 2015. 

Italian Navy ship names